Danylo Olehovych Kucher (born 25 January 1997) is a Ukrainian professional footballer who plays as a goalkeeper for Liga I club UTA Arad.

Career

Early years
Kucher is a product of Kryvbas Kryvyi Rih academy. His first coach was Oleksandr Hranovskyi.

Dnipro
In 2014 he signed a contract with Dnipro Dnipropetrovsk and played for the reserve squad. Kucher made his debut for the senior squad against Olimpik Donetsk on 15 May 2016 in the Ukrainian Premier League.

UTA Arad
In February 2023 he moved to UTA Arad.

References

External links
 
 

1997 births
Living people
Sportspeople from Kryvyi Rih
Ukrainian footballers
Association football goalkeepers
FC Dnipro players
FC Hirnyk Kryvyi Rih players
BFC Daugavpils players
FK RFS players
FC Mynai players
FC Inhulets Petrove players
FC UTA Arad players
Ukrainian Premier League players
Ukrainian Second League players
Ukrainian Amateur Football Championship players
Latvian Higher League players
Liga I players
Ukrainian expatriate footballers
Expatriate footballers in Latvia
Ukrainian expatriate sportspeople in Latvia
Expatriate footballers in Romania
Ukrainian expatriate sportspeople in Romania
Ukraine youth international footballers